Apilactobacillus is a genus of bacteria from the family of Lactobacillaceae.

Species
The genus Apilactobacillus comprises the following species:
 Apilactobacillus apinorum (Olofsson et al. 2014) Zheng et al. 2020
 Apilactobacillus bombintestini (Heo et al. 2020) Mattarelli et al. 2021

 Apilactobacillus kunkeei (Edwards et al. 1998) Zheng et al. 2020
 Apilactobacillus micheneri (McFrederick et al. 2018) Zheng et al. 2020
 Apilactobacillus ozensis (Kawasaki et al. 2011) Zheng et al. 2020
 Apilactobacillus quenuiae (McFrederick et al. 2018) Zheng et al. 2020
 Apilactobacillus timberlakei (McFrederick et al. 2018) Zheng et al. 2020
 Apilactobacillus nanyangensis Liu et al. 2021

Phylogeny
The currently accepted taxonomy is based on the List of Prokaryotic names with Standing in Nomenclature and the phylogeny is based on whole-genome sequences, except for the recently described A. nanyangensis, which has been added based on a 16S rRNA gene phylogeny by the GGDC web server.

References

Bacilli
Bacteria genera
Taxa described in 2020